Samuel Krulewitch (1871–1937) was an American politician.

Affiliated with the Republican Party and jointly nominated by the Municipal Ownership League, Krulewitch was a member of the 129th New York State Legislature, representing a portion of Manhattan on the New York State Assembly, numbered as the 32nd district. Outside of politics, Krulewitch was involved in the real estate business. He died of heart disease on March 12, 1937, in Manhattan.

References

1871 births
1937 deaths
Politicians from Manhattan
20th-century American politicians
19th-century American businesspeople
20th-century American businesspeople
Republican Party members of the New York State Assembly
American real estate businesspeople
Businesspeople from New York City